Maeve, Maev or Maiv is a female given name of Irish origin. It may derive from a word meaning "she who intoxicates", "mead-woman", or alternatively "she who rules". Medb is a queen in Irish mythology who is thought to have originally been a sovereignty goddess.

Usage
Maeve (in that spelling) was a Top 100 girls' name in Ireland for all but 12 of the 46 years between 1964 and 2009, and Meabh ranked 99th on the list of the most popular Irish girls' names of 2020.  In Northern Ireland, Maeve was a Top 100 girls' name between 1997 and 2004, and Meabh ranked 44th in 2017. It ranked 218th on the list of most popular names for girls in England and Wales in 2020 and had risen in popularity to 94th position in 2020 in those countries. It has ranked among the top 100 names for girls since 2020 in Scotland, where it was the 72nd most popular name in 2021. It has also increased in usage in the Netherlands, where it was among the top 500 names for girls in 2014 and again between 2017 and 2021. It was the 44th most common name for newborn Dutch girls in 2021.  Maeve has ranked among the 1,000 most popular names for girls born in the United States since 1997, among the top 500 names since 2013, and among the top 150 names since 2021.

People with the given name
Medb, Queen of Connacht in the Ulster Cycle of Irish mythology
Medb ingen Indrechtach mac Muiredaig, Princess of Connacht, fl. 800
Maeve Binchy (1940–2012), Irish writer
Maeve Brennan (1917–1993), Irish short story writer and journalist
Maeve Dermody (born 1985), Australian actress
Maeve Fort (born 1940), British diplomat
Maeve Gilmore (1917–1983), British artist and wife of Mervyn Peake
Maeve Harris (born 1976), American abstract painter
Maeve Higgins (born 1981), Irish comedian
Maeve Hillery (née Finnegan), retired Irish doctor, the widow of Patrick Hillery, President of Ireland 1976–90
Maeve Ingoldsby (born 1947), Irish writer
Maeve Jinkings (born 1976), Brazilian actress
Maeve Kelly (born 1930), Irish writer
Maeve Kennedy McKean, American attorney and academic
Maeve Kinkead (born 1946), American actress
Meave Leakey, paleontologist, born 1942
Maeve Ludlow, fictional character from Doctors
Maeve McCarthy, Irish mathematician
Maeve McGuire (born 1937), American actress
Maeve Murphy, Irish screenwriter and film director
Maeve O'Boyle (born 1987), Scottish singer-songwriter
Maeve O'Donovan (born 1990), Irish singer
Maeve Quaid, Canadian academic
Maeve Quinlan (born 1964), American actress and tennis player
Maeve Sherlock (born 1960), British peer

Other
Queen Maeve International Summer School, or Scoil Samhraidh Miosgán Medbha, one of Ireland's traditional music summer schools
Stella Maeve (born 1989), American actress

In popular culture
Maeve Benson, in the ABC Family drama Make It Or Break It, played by Alice Greczyn
Maeve Donavan, in the American police drama Criminal Minds
Maeve Millay, a main character in the TV series Westworld
Maeve Ridordan, in Cate Tiernan's Sweep (book series)
Maeve Ryan, in the American soap opera Ryan's Hope, played by Helen Gallagher
Maeve Rojas, in Karen McManus’s One of Us book series
Maeve Stoddard, in the American soap opera Guiding Light
Maeve Wiley, in the Netflix series Sex Education, played by Emma Mackey
Maeve, a sorceress in the Canadian TV series The Adventures of Sinbad
Maeve, a flanker class character in the popular video game Paladins: Champions of the Realm
Maeve, a Fae Queen in the Throne of Glass series
Maeve, The Winter Lady, the youngest of the Winter Queens, who is The Queen Who Is To Come in The Dresden Files series by Jim Butcher 
Queen Maeve, a superhero who is part of "The 7" on the series The Boys.
Maebh, character in the 8th series, 10th episode of Doctor Who, "In the Forest of the Night".
Queen Meve, Queen of Lyria and Rivia in The Witcher universe, who gave Geralt his title "of Rivia"
Mebh Óg MacTíre, a main character in the animated film Wolfwalkers

References

Ulster Cycle
Characters in Táin Bó Cúailnge